Centrum is a municipal neighbourhood of the city of Szczecin, Poland,  situated on the left bank of Oder river, in Śródmieście (Centre) District. It borders Śródmieście-Zachód to the west, Śródmieście-Północ to the north, Stare Miasto to the east, and Nowe Miasto to the south. As of January 2011 it had a population of 21,064.

References

Centrum